Samuel E. Hayes Jr. (born September 3, 1940) is a former Republican member of the Pennsylvania House of Representatives.  Hayes is now a part-time professor at Juniata College in Huntingdon, Pennsylvania, where he teaches classes on state and local government and the legislative process.

Samuel E. Hayes, Jr. held senior leadership positions in both the Legislative and Executive Branches of
the Commonwealth of Pennsylvania. As a lawmaker and legislative leader in the Pennsylvania House of Representatives, he served as the Majority Leader and Whip. Subsequently, Hayes served as the Secretary of Agriculture for the Commonwealth of Pennsylvania.
As a legislative leader, Hayes advocated for basic and higher education, authored Pennsylvania’s school subsidy formula, wrote legislation to fund Pennsylvania’s highway program, and increased appropriations for Penn State extension and agricultural research. As Secretary, he provided the leadership to establish the model protocols to eradicate avian influenza in poultry flocks and the plum pox virus in fruit orchards, established Pennsylvania as a national leader in farmland preservation, and expanded the Pennsylvania Farm Show complex to the largest exposition facility in the U.S.
Hayes has served as a member of copious boards and commissions, to include the Pennsylvania State Board of Education. He has chaired the Pennsylvania Farmland Preservation Board, the Pennsylvania Farm Show
Commission, the State Conservation Commission, and Pennsylvania Animal Health Commission as well as served as the President of the Pennsylvania FFA Foundation. Hayes served as a member of the board of trustees at Penn State from 1997–2014 and is currently a trustee emeritus.
Hayes has received numerous accolades and awards from a diverse group of Pennsylvania, national, and international organizations. To mention just a few, Hayes, a Vietnam Veteran, was selected for the inaugural class of the National Army ROTC Hall of Fame; the
Penn State Alumni Association’s Alumni Fellow Award; Honorary Doctor of Laws, Juniata College; the highest award bestowed by the University of Guanajuato on a person living outside the Republic of Mexico; and the Distinguished Service Award from both the Pennsylvania Farm Bureau and Penn Ag Industries.
Hayes and his wife, Elizabeth Keister ’63, live in Warriors Mark, Pa., and have three sons: Samuel, III; Lee; and Erick.

References

Republican Party members of the Pennsylvania House of Representatives
Living people
1940 births